Haverfordwest Airport , also known as Withybush Airport, is a minor airport located  north of Haverfordwest, Pembrokeshire. It is on the site of the former RAF Haverfordwest, which was operational between 1943 and 1945. Pembrokeshire County Council bought the site in the 1950s and it has been a civil airfield since, with a number of other organisations also using it.

Haverfordwest Airport has a CAA Ordinary Licence (Number P595) that allows flights for the public transport of passengers or for flying instruction, as authorised by the licensee, Pembrokeshire County Council. Outside CAA-licensed opening hours, Haverfordwest operates unlicensed.

References

External links
Haverfordwest at Airports Worldwide
EGFE Haverfordwest Information 
 

Airports in Wales
Transport in Pembrokeshire
Haverfordwest
Buildings and structures in Pembrokeshire